Atherigoninae is a subfamily of insects within the Diptera family Muscidae.

Genera
Achanthiptera Rondani, 1856
Atherigona Rondani, 1856

References

Muscidae
Diptera subfamilies